Paula Guilló Sempere (born 6 July 1989) is a Spanish beauty queen who was crowned Miss España 2010, the official representative to Miss Universe 2011, on 25 September at a gala event in the city hall square of Toledo, Spain.

Miss Spain
Born in Elche, Guilló was crowned by María José Ulla, Miss Spain 1964, breaking the tradition of being crowned by the former titleholder, in this case Estíbaliz Pereira, Miss Spain 2009.

References

External links
Official Miss España website

1989 births
Living people
Miss Spain winners
People from Elche
Miss Universe 2011 contestants